The Ramsey Quayside Railway was an extension off the ex-Manx Northern Railway from the station at Ramsey and ran along the quayside to the market square.

References 

Railway lines in the Isle of Man